Alphonse Eugène Beau de Rochas (9 April 1815, Digne-les-Bains, Alpes-de-Haute-Provence – 27 March 1893, Vincennes) was a French engineer. He was the first to patent the four-stroke engine in 1862, but he did not build one and the idea was subsequently developed by Nicolaus Otto and other engineers.

References

1815 births
1893 deaths
People from Digne-les-Bains
French engineers